Africaine is a 1981 album of 1959 recordings by Art Blakey.

Africaine (French "African woman") may also refer to:

L'Africaine (The African Woman), a grand opera by Meyerbeer
Africaine (cigarette), a Luxembourgish brand
HMS Africaine, two ships of the Royal Navy
French ship Africaine, several French ships
 , several ships